Dvinskoy is a rural locality (a settlement) and the administrative center of Dvinskoye Rural Settlement of Kholmogorsky District, Arkhangelsk Oblast, Russia. The population was 1,034 as of 2010. There are  3 streets.

Geography 
Dvinskoy is located on the Severnaya Dvina River, 133 km south of Kholmogory (the district's administrative centre) by road. Lipovik is the nearest rural locality.

References 

Rural localities in Kholmogorsky District